Phomopsis elaeagni is a fungal plant pathogen infecting black walnuts.

External links
 USDA ARS Fungal Database

Fungal tree pathogens and diseases
Nut tree diseases
elaeagni